Double Down Live: 1980 & 2008 is a two DVD set by ZZ Top, combining shows from 1980 and 2007–2008. Disc one was filmed at Grugahalle in Essen, Germany, for Rockpalast in 1980. Disc two was shot during their Hollywood Blues, El Camino Ocho and In Your Face Tours in 2008. The DVD includes live performances, interview clips and backstage footage.

The show from 1980 was reissued as a live album and a single DVD set in 2011.

Track listing

DVD Disc one
All songs by Billy Gibbons, Dusty Hill, Frank Beard except where noted.
"I Thank You" (Isaac Hayes, David Porter)
"Waitin' for the Bus" (Billy Gibbons, Dusty Hill)
"Jesus Just Left Chicago"
"Precious and Grace"
"I'm Bad, I'm Nationwide"
"Manic Mechanic"
"Lowdown in the Street
"Heard it on the X"
"Fool for Your Stockings"
"Nasty Dogs & Funky Kings"
"El Diablo"
"Cheap Sunglasses"
"Arrested for Driving While Blind"
"Beer Drinkers & Hell Raisers"
"La Grange"
"She Loves My Automobile"
"Hi Fi Mama"
"Dust My Broom" (Robert Johnson)
"Jailhouse Rock" (Jerry Leiber, Mike Stoller)
"Tush"
"Tube Snake Boogie"
"Just Got Paid" (Billy Gibbons, Bill Ham)

DVD Disc two
"Got Me Under Pressure"
"Waitin' for the Bus" (Billy Gibbons, Dusty Hill)
"Jesus Just Left Chicago"
"I'm Bad, I'm Nationwide"
"Blue Jean Blues"
"Heard it on the X"
"Just Got Paid" (Billy Gibbons, Bill Ham)
"I Need You Tonight"
"La Grange"
"Hey Joe" (Billy Roberts)
"Tush"

CD
All songs by Billy Gibbons, Dusty Hill, Frank Beard except where noted.
"El Degüello"
"I Thank You" (Isaac Hayes, David Porter)
"Waitin' for the Bus" (Billy Gibbons, Dusty Hill)
"Jesus Just Left Chicago"
"Precious and Grace"
"Manic Mechanic"
"Lowdown in the Street
"Heard it on the X"
"Fool for Your Stockings"
"Cheap Sunglasses"
"Arrested for Driving While Blind"
"Beer Drinkers & Hell Raisers"
"La Grange" / "Sloppy Drunk"/ "Bar-B-Q"
"Dust My Broom" (Robert Johnson)
"Jailhouse Rock" (Jerry Leiber, Mike Stoller)
"Tush"

ZZ Top video albums
2009 video albums
2011 live albums
Live video albums